Zenargomyia   is a genus of tachinid flies in the family Tachinidae from New South Wales. It is a parasite on the Cypress Pine Sawfly Zenarge turneri.

Species
Zenargomyia moorei Crosskey, 1964

References

Diptera of Australasia
Exoristinae
Tachinidae genera
Monotypic Brachycera genera
Taxa named by Roger Ward Crosskey